Ivan Peter Fellegi,  (born June 22, 1935) is a Hungarian-Canadian statistician and was the Chief Statistician of Canada from 1985 to 2008.

Born in Szeged, Hungary, Fellegi was in his third year of studying mathematics at the Eötvös Loránd University, when the Hungarian uprising was crushed in 1956. He arrived in Ottawa, Ontario, Canada, that year and soon began working for Statistics Canada (then known as the Dominion Bureau of Statistics), which is widely regarded as one of the best statistical agencies in the world.

He completed his studies with night courses at Carleton University. In 1958 he was the first Carleton University student to receive a Master of Science degree. Upon completing his doctoral studies in mathematical statistics in 1961, he became Carleton's first Ph.D. graduate.

In 1961 he was appointed Director of Sampling Research and Consultation staff, and Director General of the Methodology and systems Branch in 1971. He was promoted to Assistant Chief Statistician in 1973, and became Deputy Chief Statistician in 1984. On September 1, 1985, with close to 30 years experience, Fellegi was appointed Chief Statistician of Canada.  He announced his retirement as Chief Statistician on February 15, 2008.

In 1965 he was elected as a Fellow of the American Statistical Association.
In 1992, he was made a Member of the Order of Canada and was promoted to Officer in 1998. He is an honorary member of the International Statistical Institute and an honorary Fellow of the Royal Statistical Society. He provided advice on statistical matters to his native Hungary following its transition to democracy, and in 2004 he was awarded the Order of Merit of the Republic of Hungary.

References

 A newspaper profile from the Statistics Canada website
 Characteristics of an Effective Statistical System
 Carleton University Alumni
 Ottawa Citizen, February 16, 2008:  A few less surveys, a few more poems
Canadian Who's Who 1997
 

1935 births
Living people
Canadian civil servants
Hungarian emigrants to Canada
Officers of the Order of Canada
Recipients of the Order of Merit of the Republic of Hungary
Canadian statisticians
Hungarian statisticians
Canadian people of Hungarian descent
Presidents of the Statistical Society of Canada
Presidents of the International Statistical Institute
Carleton University alumni
People from Szeged
Fellows of the American Statistical Association